Junuzović is a Serbo-Croatian surname, a patronymic derived from Arabic masculine given name Yunus. Notable people with the surname include:

 Edin Junuzović (born 1986), Bosnian footballer
 Zlatko Junuzović (born 1987), Austrian footballer

Bosnian surnames
Serbian surnames
Patronymic surnames
Surnames from given names